The Tyrrell DG016 was a Formula One racing car designed by Maurice Philippe and Brian Lisles and raced by Tyrrell Racing in the 1987 FIA Formula One World Championship. It was powered by a customer Cosworth DFZ engine and driven by Jonathan Palmer and Philippe Streiff. The "DG" in the car's name was a reference to the team's major sponsor, Data General.

The DG016 was raced in two different championships: for 1987 only there was the Colin Chapman Trophy for constructors of cars equipped with naturally aspirated engines. Tyrrell were the only team to run two cars in this category for the entire season and thus easily won this championship, finishing over 100 points ahead of Larrousse-Calmels in second, while Palmer and Streiff finished first and second respectively in the equivalent championship for drivers, the Jim Clark Cup.

The car was also reasonably successful in the main Constructors' Championship, with Palmer and Streiff managing five points finishes between them: Palmer finished fifth in Monaco and Streiff sixth in his home race in France; a large attrition rate in Germany enabled Streiff to finish fourth and Palmer fifth; and Palmer again benefited from attrition to finish fourth in Australia. Palmer came 11th in the main Drivers' Championship with 7 points while Streiff came 15th with 4; the combined 11 points gave Tyrrell sixth in the Constructors' Championship, ahead of such turbo-powered teams as Arrows and Brabham.

The DG016's airbox/engine cover, which connected the top of the roll hoop to the rear end of the bodywork in a continuous curve, was a contrasting design to those of the other naturally-aspirated engine teams of 1987. AGS initially mounted a large air scoop on top of their car's engine cover before replacing it with a smaller inlet, while March and Larrousse simply removed their engine covers entirely. When F1 mandated naturally-aspirated engines for 1989, the majority of teams adopted a similar design to the DG016.

Complete Formula One results
(key)

Colin Chapman Trophy (for constructors of cars equipped with naturally aspirated engines)
(key)

References 

Tyrrell 016